Broxted is a village and civil parish in the Uttlesford district, in the county of Essex, England.

The parish includes the hamlets of Cherry Green and Brick End.

Broxted is in the parliamentary constituency of Saffron Walden.  There is a Parish Council.  According to the 2001 census it had a population of 526, reducing to 508 at the 2011 Census. The village lies on the road between Molehill Green and Thaxted. It has one public house, the Prince of Wales. In the 16th and 17th centuries, part of Broxted was known as Chawreth.

See also
 The Hundred Parishes

References

External links

 Official Broxted Website, supported by Broxted Parish Council

Villages in Essex
Uttlesford
Civil parishes in Essex